Romualdo Palacios González (8 February 1827 – 7 September 1908) was a Spanish general and governor of Puerto Rico in 1887. He is best remembered for his political persecution of Puerto Rican Autonomistas called Componte, a term that means "to rectify" or "to pacify". His favorite detention centers were the jails at the Ponce Military Barracks in Ponce and the Fort San Felipe del Morro in San Juan. Amongst his most notable persecutions was that of Román Baldorioty de Castro. Palacios was removed from office by the Spanish Government and returned to Spain on 11 November 1887. His political prisoners were released on 24 December 1887.

References 

Spanish generals
Royal Governors of Puerto Rico
1827 births
1907 deaths